Rajarajeswari Dental College and Hospital or RRDCH as commonly known, is a dental college in India. Affiliated to Rajiv Gandhi University of Health Sciences, Bangalore (A member of Association of Commonwealth Universities, UK); this institution has various accreditations including that of HLAT International, International Accreditation Organization, National Assessment and Accreditation Council and is also awarded ISO 9001:2008 by BSICS and is recognized by DCI (Dental Council of India).

History
In 2014, Royal College of Physicians and Surgeons of Glasgow, UK selected RRDCH as the center in India for part 1 and part 2 of MFDS. In 2015, RRDCH installed its own CBCT imaging unit.

Academics

Academic programmes

Undergraduate courses
 BDS

Post graduate courses
 MDS
 Oral Medicine and Radiology
 Pediatric and Preventive Dentistry
 Oral and Maxillofacial Surgery
 Periodontology
 Orthodontics and Dentofacial Orthopaedics
 Conservative Dentistry and Endodontics
 Prosthodontics and Crown & Bridge
 Oral and Maxillofacial Pathology
 Public Health Dentistry

Phd
 Prosthetics and Crown and Bridge
 Periodontology
 Orthodontics and Orthodental Orthopedics

Certificate courses
 Implantology

Rankings
In 2014, the newspaper The Pioneer ranked the Institution as one of the top private dental colleges in India.

References

External links
 http://www.dciindia.org.in/SearchCollegeDetails.aspx?Id=127

Dental colleges in Karnataka
Colleges in Bangalore
Hospitals in Bangalore
1992 establishments in Karnataka
Educational institutions established in 1992
Hospitals established in 1992